Dance Party is a 1965 studio album released by American Motown and soul girl group Martha and the Vandellas on the Gordy (Motown) label. The album was the group's third and, much like The Miracles' Mickey's Monkey album, mainly consisted of dance tunes. The singles featured on the album were their 1964 landmark single, "Dancing in the Street", their follow-up smash, "Wild One", and the hit "Nowhere to Run" and its b-side, "Motoring". The album was mostly produced by William "Mickey" Stevenson with several nods from Holland–Dozier–Holland.

Track listing

Personnel
Martha Reeves - lead vocals; backing vocals on "There He Is (At My Door)" and "Hitch Hike"
Rosalind Ashford - backing vocals
Betty Kelly - backing vocals (except "There He Is (At My Door)")
Annette Beard - backing vocals on "Hitch Hike" and "There He Is (At My Door)"
Mickey Stevenson - backing vocals (except on "Dancing Slow", "Nowhere to Run", "There He Is (At My Door)", "Mickey's Monkey" and "Hitch Hike")
Ivy Jo Hunter - backing vocals (except on "Dancing Slow", "Nowhere to Run", "There He Is (At My Door)", "Mickey's Monkey" and "Hitch Hike"), tire iron on "Dancing in the Street", percussion on "Wild One", snow chains on "Nowhere to Run"
The Funk Brothers - instrumentation:
James Jamerson - bass on "Dancing in the Street", "Wild One" and "Nowhere to Run"
Marvin Gaye - drums on "Dancing in the Street"
Benny Benjamin - drums on "Wild One" and "Nowhere to Run"
Earl Van Dyke - piano on "Nowhere to Run" 
Jack Ashford - tambourine on "Dancing in the Street", "Wild One" and "Nowhere to Run"
Joe Messina - guitar on "Dancing in the Street"
Eddie Willis - guitar on "Dancing in the Street", "Wild One" and "Nowhere to Run" 
Robert White - guitar on "Dancing in the Street", "Wild One" and "Nowhere to Run"
Russ Conway - trumpet on "Dancing in the Street", "Wild One" and "Nowhere to Run" 
Herbert Williams - trumpet on "Dancing in the Street", "Wild One" and "Nowhere to Run" 
George Bohanon - trombone on "Dancing in the Street", "Wild One" and "Nowhere to Run" 
Paul Riser - trombone on "Dancing in the Street", "Wild One" and "Nowhere to Run" 
Henry Cosby - tenor saxophone on "Dancing in the Street", "Wild One" and "Nowhere to Run"
Thomas "Beans" Bowles - baritone saxophone on "Dancing in the Street"
Mike Terry - baritone saxophone on "Wild One" and "Nowhere to Run"

References

1965 albums
Gordy Records albums
Martha and the Vandellas albums
Albums produced by Brian Holland
Albums produced by Lamont Dozier
Albums produced by William "Mickey" Stevenson
Albums recorded at Hitsville U.S.A.
Albums produced by Edward Holland Jr.